SMA Negeri 5 Parepare or also known as Smaeli is one of the high schools in South Sulawesi, Indonesia. The school is implementing a system or boarding school Boarding School.

Headmaster
Drs. Mohammad Nur Efendi (2005–2008)
Drs. Irman MR, M.Pd (2008–2009)
Drs. Ahmad Ismail (2009–2010)
Drs. H. Mas'ud Muhammad, M.Pd (2010–2015)
Drs. Muhammad Anshar Rahim (2015–2017)
Hamzah Wakkang, S.Pd, M.Pd (2017–present)

References

2005 establishments in Indonesia
Education in South Sulawesi
Educational institutions established in 2005
Senior high schools in Indonesia